Bryan Burton Buckley, 2nd Baron Wrenbury (24 May 1890 – 29 May 1940) was a British peer.

The son of Henry Buckley, 1st Baron Wrenbury he was born on 24 May 1890 and educated at Eton and King's College, Cambridge. He was called to the bar in 1913. During World War One he served with the London Regiment. In 1925 he married  Helen Malise Graham (1890–1981) : they had one son, his heir John Burton Buckley and one daughter Mary Graham Buckley.

References

1890 births
1940 deaths
People educated at Eton College
Alumni of King's College, Cambridge
Barons in the Peerage of the United Kingdom
London Regiment officers
English barristers
20th-century English lawyers
British Army personnel of World War I